Morenhoven is a farming village in the municipality Swisttal in the North Rhine-Westphalian Rhein-Sieg district. It is situated approximately 12 km west of Bonn. In 2007 it had 1650 inhabitants.

References

External links 
 Website of the municipality Swisttal (German)

Towns in North Rhine-Westphalia